Hasyaratna Ramakrishna is a 1982 Indian Kannada language comedy film directed by B. S. Ranga. The film stars Anant Nag in the role of a poet, Ramakrishna. It also features Aarathi, Manjula, Sripriya and Srinath in the pivotal roles. The film was a remake of director's own Telugu film Tenali Ramakrishna (1956) which was based on the story of Tenali Rama.

Cast
 Anant Nag as Ramakrishna
 Aarathi as Kamala
 Srinath as Krishnadevaraya
 Manjula
 Sripriya as Krishnasani
 Pramila Joshai
 K. S. Ashwath
 Shivaram
 Dinesh
 Mandeep Roy

Soundtrack

T. G. Lingappa composed the soundtrack, and lyrics were written by Chi. Udaya Shankar. The album consists of eight soundtracks.

References

External links
 

1982 films
1980s Kannada-language films
Films scored by T. G. Lingappa
Kannada remakes of Telugu films
Films directed by B. S. Ranga